Trust in Trance Records is the second record label started by Avi Nissim, Yaniv Haviv and Guy Sabbag (they were shortly joined by Lior Perlmutter) in late 1993.

The label was formed under the name Outmosphere Records late in 1993.
It was founded by Avi Nissim, Lior Perlmutter, Yaniv Haviv (SFX and later Astral Projection) and Guy Sabbag. They are pioneers of the Israeli Psychedelic Trance.

After the success of the first compilation album Trust In Trance in February 1994, they decided to change the label's name to Trust In Trance. Later that year, Guy Sabbag left the label. Avi, Lior and Yaniv created the album Trust In Trance 2 with the
3 super hits: Mahadeva, Power Gen & Innovation. The label is now defunct.

Compilations in cooperation with Phonokol
Goa Vibes
Psychedelic Vibes
Israel's Psychedelic Trance
Trust In Trance

Releases from
MFG
Power Source
Mystica
Xerox
Shidapu
Nada
Domestic
The Passenger
Children of the Doc

Released albums
Various - Back To Galaxy
Various - Goa Vibes Vol. 1
Various - Goa Vibes Vol. 2
Various - Trust in Trance 3
Various - Goa Vibes Vol. 3
Various - Israel's Psychedelic Trance
Astral Projection - The Astral Files
Various - Psychedelic Vibes
Various - Psychedelic Vibes 2
Various - Israel's Psychedelic Trance Vol. 2
Astral Projection - Dancing Galaxy
Various - Psychedelic Vibes 3
Various - Psychedelic Vibes 4
Various - Eternal Trance
SFX - The Unreleased Tracks 89-94
Various - Israel's Psychedelic Trance Vol. 3
Various - Psychedelic Vibes 5
Astral Projection - Another World
Various - The Next Millennium
Various - Psychedelic Vibes 6
Various - Israel's Psychedelic Trance Vol. 4
Various - Psychedelic Vibes 7

See also
 List of record labels

Israeli record labels
Record labels established in 1993
Defunct record labels
Psychedelic trance record labels